The San Diego Fleet was a professional American football franchise based in San Diego, California, and one of the eight members of the Alliance of American Football (AAF). The league began play in February 2019, with the team playing its home games at SDCCU Stadium. They were coached by former NFL head coach Mike Martz. The team was one of the two professional football teams playing in San Diego, along with the San Diego Strike Force of the Indoor Football League, and the first since the former San Diego Chargers moved to Los Angeles in 2017. The Fleet played their home games at SDCCU Stadium.

In April 2019 the league suspended football operations and allowed players to break their contracts. On April 17 the league filed for bankruptcy, cutting the season short and putting all eight teams out of business, since under the AAF organizational plan all teams were funded by the central organization.

History
The Alliance San Diego team and head coach, Mike Martz, was announced by the Alliance of American Football on May 29, 2018. Early reports had Rick Neuheisel coaching the team before he instead agreed to take the coaching job in Phoenix. Alliance San Diego's name, logo and colors were revealed on September 25, 2018, as the San Diego Fleet (battleship gray, yellow and silver gray) along with the other three western teams. The name indicates the city's ties to the United States Navy.

The team pays $25,000 per game in rent to use SDCCU Stadium and covers an additional $160,000 per game in other game-related expenses the city incurs.

The Fleet held the first-overall pick in the league's 2019 AAF QB Draft, which was used to protect Josh Johnson. Johnson, who signed with the NFL's Washington Redskins before the end of the 2018 season, never played for the Fleet. The final 52-man roster was set on January 30.

Dre Bly, who had played cornerback for Martz with the St. Louis Rams, was originally slated to coach defensive backs, but stepped down to take a similar position at the University of North Carolina. Former NFL quarterback Jon Kitna was also announced as the team's offensive coordinator in June 2018. However, he did not coach a game for the Fleet as he was hired by the Dallas Cowboys in January 2019 to become their quarterbacks coach.

The team's first game was a loss at the Alamodome against the San Antonio Commanders on Saturday, February 9, 2019, with the game broadcast live on CBS. The Fleet won its first three home games before enthusiastic crowds and was third in attendance among the eight-team league.

On April 2, 2019, the Alliance for American Football suspended football operations, and on April 4 the league allowed players to leave their contracts to sign with NFL teams. The effect was to cancel the final two regular season games and the scheduled post-season playoffs. The Fleet athletes and coaches, who were in Orlando getting ready for a game against the Orlando Apollos, suddenly "found themselves paying their own hotel bills and buying their own plane tickets home."

The league filed for Chapter 7 bankruptcy on April 17, 2019. The Fleet's final record for the abbreviated season was 3-5.

Final Roster

Allocation pool 
The team's assigned area, which designates player rights, includes the following:

Colleges
Arkansas
 Azusa Pacific
 Cal Poly
 Colorado
 Fresno State
 Hawaii
 Humboldt State
 Sacramento State
 San Diego

 San Diego State
 San Jose State
 Stanford
 UC Davis
 UNLV
 USC
 Washington

National Football League (NFL)
 Detroit Lions
 Los Angeles Chargers
 Los Angeles Rams
 Oakland Raiders

Canadian Football League (CFL)
 BC Lions

Staff

Notable Former Players 

 Daniel Brunskill - Current Tennessee Titans Offensive Lineman
 Gavin Escobar - Former Dallas Cowboys Tight End
 Bishop Sankey - Former Tennessee Titans Running Back, 2014 Second Round Pick

2019 season

Final standings

Schedule

Preseason

Regular season
All times Pacific

Game summaries

Week 1: at San Antonio

Week 2: vs. Atlanta

Week 3: vs. San Antonio

Week 4: at Memphis

Week 5: vs. Salt Lake

Week 6: vs. Birmingham

Week 7: at Arizona

Week 8: at Salt Lake

Media
On February 7, 2019, the Fleet announced that KLSD and KOGO would be the team's flagship radio stations. Jon Schaeffer handled play-by-play with former Charger Rich Ohrnberger doing color commentary. KOGO also airs in greater L.A.

References

Further reading
 

 
2018 establishments in California
2019 disestablishments in California